"Flawless" is the third single of rapper V.I.C. from his debut album Beast. The single is produced by Mr. Collipark. The song hit radio on November 4, 2008.

References
V.I.C.'s Official justRHYMES.com profile| http://www.justrhymes.com

Chart positions

2008 singles
2008 songs
Warner Records singles